Tonucci is an Italian surname. Notable people with the surname include:

Alessandro Tonucci (born 1993), Italian motorcycle racer
Denis Tonucci (born 1988), Italian footballer
Giovanni Tonucci (born 1941), Italian titular archbishop
Giuseppe Tonucci (1938–1988), Italian cyclist

See also
8192 Tonucci, a main-belt asteroid

Italian-language surnames